The Mangayat (also, Bugwa and Bukwa) are an ethnic group living in the South Sudanese state of Western Bahr el Ghazal.

They speak Mangayat, a Niger–Congo language. The number of persons in this ethnic group likely is below 1000.

References

Ethnic groups in South Sudan